Serisay Barthélémy (born 6 January 1984) is a French professional footballer who plays as a midfielder.

Career
A product of AS Saint-Étienne's youth system, Barthelemy never played for the club's senior side. He played over 100 competitive matches with SC Bastia before brief spells at AS Cannes and FC Edmonton.

References

External links

1984 births
Living people
AS Cannes players
AS Saint-Étienne players
Expatriate soccer players in Canada
FC Edmonton players
French footballers
People from Le Blanc-Mesnil
SC Bastia players
North American Soccer League players
Borgo FC players
Association football midfielders
French people of Laotian descent
Footballers from Seine-Saint-Denis